William Glen or Glenn may refer to:

William Glen (geologist) (born 1932), American geologist and historian of science
William Glen (poet) (1789–1826), Scottish poet
William Glen (footballer) (1903–1981), Irish football player
William Glenn (1914–2003), American cardiac surgeon
William E. Glenn (1926–2013), American inventor
William H. Glenn (1872–1940), American industrialist
Billy Glenn (William Spiers Glenn, 1877–1953), New Zealand politician